The Journal of African Business is a quarterly peer-reviewed academic journal covering all aspects of business studies related to Africa. It was established in 2000 and is the official journal of the International Academy of African Business and Development. Since 2014, the academy publishes it in association with Routledge. The editor-in-chief is Moses Acquaah (University of North Carolina at Greensboro).

Abstracting and indexing
The journal is abstracted and indexed in:
EBSCO databases
EconLit
Emerging Sources Citation Index
GEOBASE
International Bibliography of Periodical Literature
International Bibliography of the Social Sciences
ProQuest databases
Scopus

Editors-in-chief
The following persons are or have been editor-in-chief:
Moses Acquaah (University of North Carolina at Greensboro)
Samuel Bonsu (Ghana Institute of Management and Public Administration)
Isaac Otchere (Carleton University)
Simon P. Sigué (Athabasca University)
Kofi Q. Dadzie (Georgia State University)
Sam C. Okoroafo (University of Toledo)

References

External links

Publications established in 2000
African studies journals
Business and management journals
Routledge academic journals
Quarterly journals
English-language journals